The 1990 United States rugby union tour of Australia was a series of six matches played by the United States national rugby union team in Australia in June and July 1990. The United States team won three of their six matches, drew one and lost two, including the international match against the Australia national rugby union team.

Matches 
Scores and results list United States's points tally first.

References

 

1990
1990
1990 rugby union tours
tour
1990 in American rugby union